Galena is a census-designated place (CDP) in Floyd County, Indiana, United States. The population was 1,818 at the 2010 census. The CDP includes the town of Galena as well as the nearby town of Floyds Knobs and their immediate surroundings.

History
Galena was originally called Germantown, and under the latter name was platted in 1837. A post office was established as Galena in 1843, and remained in operation until it was discontinued in 1933.

Geography
Galena is located at  (38.350585, -85.940435).

Demographics

2010 census
As of the census of 2010, there were 1,818 people, 637 households, and 534 families residing in the CDP. The racial makeup of the CDP was 98.6% White, 0.2% Native American, 0.6% Asian, 0.1% from other races, and 0.6% from two or more races. Hispanic or Latino of any race were 0.7% of the population.

There were 637 households, of which 42.4% had children under the age of 18 living with them, 68.0% were married couples living together, 10.5% had a female householder with no husband present, 5.3% had a male householder with no wife present, and 16.2% were non-families. 12.9% of all households were made up of individuals, and 4.9% had someone living alone who was 65 years of age or older. The average household size was 2.85 and the average family size was 3.12.

The median age in the CDP was 38.2 years. 27% of residents were under the age of 18; 8.4% were between the ages of 18 and 24; 25.4% were from 25 to 44; 29.5% were from 45 to 64; and 9.8% were 65 years of age or older. The gender makeup of the CDP was 48.8% male and 51.2% female.

2000 census
As of the census of 2000, there were 1,831 people, 622 households, and 539 families residing in the CDP. The racial makeup of the CDP was 97.87% White, 0.22% African American, 0.38% Native American, 0.66% Asian, 0.16% from other races, and 0.71% from two or more races. Hispanic or Latino of any race were 0.87% of the population.

There were 622 households, out of which 48.2% had children under the age of 18 living with them, 74.3% were married couples living together, 10.0% had a female householder with no husband present, and 13.3% were non-families. 10.9% of all households were made up of individuals, and 2.6% had someone living alone who was 65 years of age or older. The average household size was 2.94 and the average family size was 3.19.

In the CDP, the population was spread out, with 31.7% under the age of 18, 6.1% from 18 to 24, 34.7% from 25 to 44, 21.5% from 45 to 64, and 6.0% who were 65 years of age or older. The median age was 34 years. For every 100 females, there were 95.4 males. For every 100 females age 18 and over, there were 92.2 males.

The median income for a household in the CDP was $60,313, and the median income for a family was $67,569. Males had a median income of $47,455 versus $31,193 for females. The per capita income for the CDP was $23,824. About 3.3% of families and 2.9% of the population were below the poverty line, including 1.4% of those under age 18 and 4.1% of those age 65 or over.

Education
Galena is within the New Albany-Floyd County Consolidated School Corporation.

The western half of Galena is in the attendance boundary of Greenville Elementary School, while the eastern half is assigned to Floyds Knobs Elementary School. All of Galena is within the attendance boundaries of Highland Hills Middle School, and Floyd Central High School.

References

Census-designated places in Floyd County, Indiana
Census-designated places in Indiana
Louisville metropolitan area
Populated places established in 1837
1837 establishments in Indiana